Halocoryza whiteheadiana is a species of brown coloured ground beetle in the subfamily Scaritinae which is endemic to Baja California Sur, Mexico.

References

Beetles described in 2011
Endemic insects of Mexico
Scaritinae
Endemic fauna of the Baja California Peninsula